The Internationalnaya mine is one of the largest diamond mines in Russia and in the world. The mine is located in the north-eastern part of the country in the Sakha Republic. The mine has estimated reserves of 61.9 million carats of diamonds and an annual production capacity of 5.9 million carats.

References 

Diamond mines in Russia
Diamond mines in the Soviet Union